Mathaganeri is a village in Tirunelveli District, the state of Tamil Nadu, India. It is also called Mathaganelloor. 

Mathagai Mutharamman temple, Sriman Narayana Swamy temple, Manthkarai Sudalaimada Swamy temple, Manna Raja temple, Isakkiyamman temple, Therkathiyan, and many more famous temples can be found in Mathaganeri. Additional to this temple the village has two more Temples and they are Amman Kovil, Guru Swamy Kovil. Sriman Narayana Swamy Temple is going to rebuilt by the Madhaganeri people and the ceremony of erecting a base of the temple held on 23 April 2019.

The Madhaganeri people is all set to inaugurate new construction of Sriman Narayana Swami Temple on 5th of February in the presence of honourable Kumari

External link
mathaganellurnaarayanaswamy.com

Villages in Tirunelveli district